The International Wheelchair and Amputee Sports (IWAS) World Games (or IWAS World Games) are a multi-sport competition for athletes with a disability, which were the forerunner of the Paralympic Games. The competition has been formerly known as the World Wheelchair and Amputee Games, the World Wheelchair Games, the International Stoke Mandeville Games,  the Stoke Mandeville Games (SMG), and in the 1960s and 1970s was often referred to as the Wheelchair Olympics.

The Games were originally held in 1948 by neurologist Sir Ludwig Guttmann, who organized a sporting competition involving World War II veterans with spinal cord injuries at the Stoke Mandeville Hospital rehabilitation facility in Aylesbury, England, taking place concurrently with the first post-war Summer Olympics in London. In 1952, the Netherlands joined in the event, creating the first international sports competition for disabled people. In 1960, the Ninth Stoke Mandeville Games were held in Rome, Italy, following that year's Olympic Games. These are considered to be the first Paralympic Games. The 2012 Paralympic mascot Mandeville was named after Stoke Mandeville Hospital.

While the Paralympic Games evolved to include athletes from all disability groups, the Stoke Mandeville games continued to be organized as a multi-sport event for wheelchair athletes. Games were held annually in Aylesbury under the direction of the International Stoke Mandeville Games Federation (ISMGF), which became the International Stoke Mandeville Wheelchair Sports Federation (ISMWSF).

In 1999, the World Wheelchair Games were held in Christchurch, New Zealand. In 2003, the Games were again held in Christchurch, and combined with a competition for amputee athletes organized by the International Sports Organization for the Disabled. In 2004, ISMWSF and ISOD merged to create the International Wheelchair and Amputee Sports Federation (IWAS). The first games held under the name IWAS World Wheelchair and Amputee Games were held in 2005 in Rio de Janeiro, Brazil. The second IWAS Games were held in 2007 in Chinese Taipei and the third IWAS games were held in Bangalore, India in November 2009.

Games by year 
The inaugural competition, initially named "Stoke Mandeville Games for the Paralyzed" in 1948, was just named "Stoke Mandeville Games" the next year, before becoming the "International Stoke Mandeville Games" (ISMG) in 1952.

Beginning in 1960 during Summer Olympic years, the ISMG were held in the same host city as the Summer Olympics. These particular editions of the Games were retroactively recognised as being the first four Summer Paralympic Games. The Games were otherwise hosted in Stoke Mandeville in all other years. Beginning in 1976, the Paralympic Games began hosting athletes from various disability groups, and considered a distinct event from the ISMG—which were held in Stoke Mandeville during non-Olympic years until 1997.

From 1997, the former International Stoke Mandeville Games yearly event (except on years of Paralympic Games already replacing them) became the "World Wheelchair Games"; it was later renamed "World Wheelchair and Amputee Games" from 2005, and "International Wheelchair and Amputee Sports (IWAS) World Games" from 2009.

IWAS World Games 
Names :
 1-International Stoke Mandeville Games (1948 to 1995): 39 editions occurring every year (including 4 editions before 1976 that were backwardly recognized also as the first 4 Paralympic Games), except on years of Paralympic Games since 1976
 2-World Wheelchair Games (1997 to 2003): 6 editions occurring every year, except on years of Paralympic Games
 3-World Wheelchair and Amputee Games (2005 to 2007): 3 editions occurring every year, except on years of Paralympic Games
 4-IWAS World Games (since 2009): 6 editions occurring every 2 years with odd numbers, except on years of Paralympic Games (when the Paralympic Games were postponed from 2020 to 2021, they replaced the IWAS World Games)

 International Stoke Mandeville Wheelchair Sports Federation (ISMWSF)

IWAS Under 23 World Games (IWAS Junior World Games) 
For some years now, the IWAS Federation has hosted junior competitions, which were named IWAS World Junior Games by 2015. Since 2016 they are called IWAS Under 23 World Games and will only be played in years with even numbers.

 http://www.iwasf.com/iwasf/index.cfm/games/iwas-world-junior-games1111/past-games111/

See also 
 International Wheelchair and Amputee Sports Federation

References

External links
 Summer Games Governance 1960 to 1992, IWAS
 IWAS World Games from the International Wheelchair and Amputee Sports Federation (IWAS) website
 "2012 – The Paralympics come home", BBC, July 4, 2008. A look back at the origins of the Stoke Mandeville Games.

Disabled multi-sport events
Recurring sporting events established in 1948